For the 1998–99 season, Carlisle United F.C. competed in Football League Division Three. This season for Carlisle is known for the final day of the season for when Jimmy Glass a goalkeeper signed on an emergency loan from Swindon Town FC (Due to the current goalkeeper being sold) scored on the final day of the season which kept Carlisle in the Football League.

Results & fixtures

Football League Third Division

Football League Cup

FA Cup

Football League Trophy

References

Carlisle United 1998–1999 at soccerbase.com (use drop down list to select relevant season)

 11v11

Carlisle United F.C. seasons